Fasharud (also Romanized as Fashārūd; also known as Feshār Rūd) is a village in Galehzan Rural District, in the Central District of Khomeyn County, Markazi Province, Iran. At the 2006 census, its population was 121, in 42 families.

References 

Populated places in Khomeyn County